Peter Alexander Fillmore  (born April 25, 1966) is a Canadian Liberal politician who has represented the riding of Halifax in the House of Commons of Canada since 2015.

Early life and education
Born in Bloomington, Indiana to Atlantic Canadian parents studying abroad in the United States, Fillmore returned to the family's native Nova Scotia at the age of four. In Halifax he attended Tower Road School, Halifax Grammar School, Gorsebrook Junior High, and Queen Elizabeth High School. He began his post-secondary studies in engineering at Acadia University but transferred to the Technical University of Nova Scotia (since merged into Dalhousie University) where he completed an undergraduate architecture degree in 1990, followed by a graduate degree in urban and rural planning in 1992. He was awarded a graduate degree in Design Studies (specialty in Urban Design) from the Harvard Graduate School of Design in 1995.

Career
An urban planner and urban designer by profession, Fillmore began his career in Boston, Massachusetts working on the Big Dig project as an urban designer, and later joined the architecture and planning firm Arrowstreet Inc. He later moved to Maine where he was the Town Planner in Cumberland, Maine, and subsequently founded the architectural design and town planning firm Interurban Planning & Design. In 2005, he returned home to Halifax, Nova Scotia to serve as the first-ever Manager of Urban Design for the City of Halifax, leading the implementation of the "HRM by Design" Downtown Halifax Plan. He also served as Director of the Dalhousie University School of Planning, and was vice president, Planning & Development of the Waterfront Development Corporation Limited, a crown corporation charged with revitalizing prominent post-industrial waterfronts in Nova Scotia.

As Member of Parliament for Halifax, Fillmore has held a number of additional responsibilities in the House of Commons and in the Government of Canada. In the 42nd Canadian Parliament, Fillmore was appointed in December 2015 to the all-party Standing Committee on Indigenous and Northern Affairs. On February 4, 2016, he was elected as the chairman of the committee, serving in that role until January 2017. Beginning in January 2017, Fillmore was appointed Parliamentary Secretary to the Minister of Democratic Institutions, Karina Gould. Beginning September 2018, Fillmore was appointed Parliamentary Secretary to the Minister of Canadian Heritage and Multiculturalism, Pablo Rodriguez. Following his reelection to the House of Commons for the 43rd Canadian Parliament in the October 2019 federal election, Fillmore was appointed Parliamentary Secretary to Canada's Minister of Infrastructure and Communities, Catherine McKenna.

Electoral record

References

External links
 Official Website

Living people
Members of the House of Commons of Canada from Nova Scotia
Liberal Party of Canada MPs
Canadian urban planners
1966 births
Dalhousie University alumni
Academic staff of the Dalhousie University
Politicians from Bloomington, Indiana
Harvard Graduate School of Design alumni
21st-century Canadian politicians